Hydroman is a fictional superhero character who first appeared in comic books from Eastern Color Printing in 1940.

Created by Bill Everett, Hydroman first appeared in the premiere issue of Reg'lar Fellers Heroic Comics (August 1940).

History
In Superhero Comics of the Golden Age, Mike Benton wrote: 

Issue #14 (Sept. 1942) introduced Rainbow Boy, who would be Hydroman's sidekick. Hydroman's last appearance in this title was in issue #29 (March 1945).

In 2008, Hydroman appeared in the Dynamite Entertainment miniseries Project Superpowers; here he was referred to by the nickname "Hydro", possibly to avoid any conflicts with Marvel Comics who by now had a supervillain character called Hydro-Man.

Fictional biography
In 1940, a young chemical engineer named Harry Thurston accidentally created a compound that could convert human flesh into water, and he spilled some on his hand. He called out to his friend Bob Blake, who was then accidentally doused with a large amount of the substance and turned completely into "living water". Harry found an antidote and poured it into Bob. Restored to human form, Bob soon discovered that he could now transform any part of his body into water and control its form and movement. Deciding to put his new abilities to good use, Bob became a costumed crimefighter and called himself Hydroman. Originally his outfit was shirtless, but later he wore a see-through shirt.

According to Jess Nevins' Encyclopedia of Golden Age Superheroes, "Hydroman defeats spies, an alien invasion led by the Great One, Yellow Perils, fifth columnists, the Phantom, the Alchemist, and the Native American murderer Black Bird".

Later, Hydroman gained a partner in the form of Jay Watson, a young employee of the Wizard Kid Radio Program. When exposed to sunlight, Jay could fly at the speed of light, leaving a rainbow-like trail in his wake which he could shape and control (much like Green Lantern's ring power). In his costumed identity of "Rainbow Boy", Jay worked with Hydroman and also went on solo adventures.

Project Superpowers
At some point after World War II, Hydroman and Rainbow Boy were each trapped and imprisoned in the mystical Urn of Pandora (along with scores of other heroes) by the misguided Fighting Yank. Decades later, the Urn was broken and the heroes freed. Hydroman found himself allied with a group of heroes called The Superpowers, who were determined to counteract the totalitarian actions and agenda of the current rulers of the world. Rainbow Boy, on the other hand, joined a group of kid heroes and sidekicks called The Inheritors, who are at odds with the adult heroes.

Powers and abilities
After being doused with a chemical compound, Hydroman can transform any part of his body into water, and control its form and movement.

References

External links
 Hydroman at Don Markstein's Toonopedia. Archived from the original on February 5, 2016.
 
 
 Hydroman at International Catalogue of Superheroes
 Rainbow Boy at International Catalogue of Superheroes

Dynamite Entertainment characters
Golden Age superheroes
Comics characters introduced in 1940
Characters created by Bill Everett